Susanne von Almassy (1916–2009) was an Austrian stage and film actress.

Selected filmography
 The Disturbed Wedding Night (1950)
 A Rare Lover (1950)
 Mailman Mueller (1953)
 The Story of Anastasia (1956)
 My Father, the Actor (1956)
 Stresemann (1957)
 The Red Hand (1960)

References

Bibliography
 Dassanowsky, Robert. Austrian Cinema: A History. McFarland & Company, 2005.

External links

1916 births
2009 deaths
Austrian film actresses
Austrian stage actresses
Austrian television actresses
20th-century Austrian actresses
Actresses from Vienna